The Idaho Vandals men's basketball team represents the University of Idaho, located in Moscow, Idaho, in NCAA Division I basketball competition. They currently compete in the Big Sky Conference. The Vandals were most recently coached by Zac Claus and play home games at the new Idaho Central Credit Union Arena. This venue, which also houses the women's basketball team, opened in 2021 as the replacement for the Vandals' primary home of the Kibbie Dome, whose basketball configuration was known as Cowan Spectrum, and alternate venue of Memorial Gym.

The program's two most notable seasons were in 1962–63 and 1981–82. The Vandals went  in 1963 and featured future hall of famer  The 1982 team  was ranked sixth in both polls at the end of the regular  repeated as regular season and conference tournament  and reached the Sweet Sixteen of the

Post-season

NCAA tournament results
The Vandals have appeared in four NCAA Tournaments, with an overall record of 1–4.

NIT results
Idaho has one National Invitation Tournament appearance and lost in the first round;it was the first NIT invitation for the Big Sky

CIT results
The Vandals have participated in four CollegeInsider.com Tournaments,and their combined record is

CBI results
The Vandals have participated in the one College Basketball Invitational (CBI). Their record is 0–1.

Other postseason
Idaho also participated in the very first national championship tournament ever held in intercollegiate basketball, the 1922 National Intercollegiate Basketball Tournament, where they lost in the quarterfinals to Kalamazoo College.

Individual records

Notable players
Kaniel Dickens – 50th overall selection in 2000 NBA draft
Gus Johnson – 10th overall selection in 1963 NBA draft – dominant NBA power forward in the 1960s – Basketball Hall of Fame (2010)
Orlando Lightfoot all-time leading scorer of the Vandals with 2,102 points.

Retired numbers

Season-by-season records

References

External links
 
Sports Reference – Idaho Vandals basketball